Aziza Othmana (1606-1669) was a Tunisian princess belonging to the Mouradites dynasty.

References

1606 births
1669 deaths
African princesses
Tunisian women
Date of birth unknown
Date of death unknown
Place of birth unknown
Place of death unknown